The 2018–19 season is Hyderabad cricket team's 85th competitive season. The Hyderabad cricket team and Hyderabad women's cricket team are senior men's and women's domestic cricket teams based in the city of Hyderabad, India, run by the Hyderabad Cricket Association (HCA). They represent the state of Telangana in domestic competitions.

Competition overview

Senior men's team

Squads
 Head coach: Arjun Yadav
 Bowling Coach : Narender Pal Singh
 Fielding Coach : T Dilip
 Physio : Bheesham Pratap Singh
 Trainer : Naveen Reddy

Pragyan Ojha moved to the Bihar ahead of the 2018–19 season. The Hyderabad also got new coach with Yadav replacing J. Arunkumar.

Duleep Trophy
Sandeep got selected to the India Red squad for the 2018–19 Duleep Trophy, a first-class cricket tournament in India.

Deodhar Trophy
Siraj got selected to the India A while Rohit to the India B for the 2018–19 Deodhar Trophy, a List A cricket tournament in India.

Indian Premier League
Siraj and Rayudu were retained by the Royal Challengers Bangalore and the Chennai Super Kings ahead of the auction for the 2019 Indian Premier League, a professional Twenty20 cricket league in India. None of the Hyderabad players were picked by the franchises during the auction.

Vijay Hazare Trophy

The Vijay Hazare Trophy, a List A cricket tournament in India, fixtures were announced by the Board of Control for Cricket in India (BCCI) on 29 August 2018 and the Hyderabad was placed in the Group B with all the group fixtures to be played in New Delhi. The team was selected on 12 September with Akshath Reddy appointed as the captain and Arjun Yadav as the head coach. Ambati Rayudu missed out on the selection because of his national duties for the 2018 Asia Cup while Chama Milind, who missed out last season because of the injury, made a comeback into the squad. Though there were doubts on the team selected owing to the eligibility of the selection committee who were appointed by the steering committee led by former players like V. V. S. Laxman and Mohammad Azharuddin but did not get cleared by the HCA general body as per the BCCI rule book, the team finally got the nod for the tournament on 18 September from the High Court appointed Committee of Administrators (CoA) though the CoA declared the selection committee illegal.

The Hyderabad began their campaign on a winning note defeating the Madhya Pradesh by seven wickets. The Hyderabadi bowlers took regular wickets to bowl-out Madhya Pradesh to 231 while measured half-centuries from Tanmay Agarwal and Rohit Rayudu completed the chase for the Hyderabad with seven wickets and 14 balls to spare. In the second match, Nitish Rana's unbeaten knock of 91 in 87 balls helped the Delhi chase the revised target of 176 in 30.4 overs in a rain-hit match to hand the Hyderabad their first defeat in the tournament. Earlier, it was Manan Sharma who troubled the Hyderabad batsmen in the middle with his four-wicket haul until Mohammad Siraj's cameo at the end with a couple of sixes that helped the Hyderabad to recover to 205. In another rain-affected reduced-over match, the Saurashtra successfully chased the revised target of 110 in 19 overs with the combined batting effort from Robin Uthappa, Aarpit Vasavada and Prerak Mankad. Earlier, the Hyderabad recovered in the middle from the top-order collapse with 95-run partnership between Kolla Sumanth and Bavanaka Sandeep but could not capitalize on that partnership as the Hyderabad suffered from another collapse at the end and were restricted to 196 in 45 overs. The Hyderabad's match against the Andhra, their fourth match of the tournament, was washed off due to the incessant rains in Delhi. In the fifth match, Mehdi Hasan's maiden fifer helped the Hyderabad bowl out the Uttar Pradesh for 130 despite their skipper, Suresh Raina's half-century while the opening partnership of 124 between Akshath and Tanmay handed the Hyderabad a 9-wicket win over the Uttar Pradesh. Chasing 223 to win, the Chhattisgarh were bowled out to 121 with Palakodeti Sairam and Mehdi sharing three wickets between them as the Hyderabad secured their third win in six matches. Earlier, Rohit's half-century along with the support from Sandeep's 41 helped the Hyderabad post 222 in 50 overs. Siraj missed the rest of the group matches for the Hyderabad as he was selected to the national team for the test series against the West Indies. In the seventh match, two-wicket hauls along with the tight bowling from Sairam and Ravi Kiran helped the Hyderabad restrict the Kerala to 189 despite the half-century from VA Jagadeesh while an unbeaten century partnership between Rohit and Sandeep completed the chase for the Hyderabad with seven wickets to spare. The Hyderabad survived the scare in their last group match defeating the Odisha narrowly by one wicket but still need the favorable results on the last day to qualify for the knockout stage. Chasing 248 to win, the Hyderabad enjoyed the strong start with the half-centuries from their openers, Tanmay and Akshath but their dismissals triggered the batting collapsed until an unbeaten 43-run knock from Sumanth completed the chase despite the flurry of wickets at the other end. Earlier, the Odisha had a strong start too with the century partnership between Govinda Poddar and Subhranshu Senapati but the six-wicket haul from Milind helped the Hyderabad restrict the Odisha to 247. The defeat of the Baroda to the Maharashtra in the Group A helped the Hyderabad advance to the knockout stage as they finished third in the Group B and fifth across the groups A & B with five wins, two losses and a draw.

The fixtures for the knockout stage were announced by the BCCI on 11 October with Bengaluru hosting all the fixtures as the Hyderabad faced the Andhra in the quarter-final on 15 October. The Hyderabad announced their squad for the knockout stage on 11 October as Rayudu came back to the squad to lead the team following the completion of the Asia Cup. Rayudu replaced Himalay Agarwal while Mohammad Muddassir replaced Siraj and the Hyderabad's U–19 all-rounder, Ajay Dev Goud replaced Ashish Reddy. With Siraj not being selected into playing XI for the India during the on-going West Indies Test Series, he was released by the BCCI on 14 October to play for the Hyderabad during the knockout stage. Chasing 282 in 50 overs, the Andhra lost the first wicket to Siraj but the half-centuries from Hanuma Vihari and Ricky Bhui put the Andhra in the winning position only for the Siraj to come back and remove the both set-batsmen that triggered the Andhra's collapse as they were restricted to 267 and helped the Hyderabad advance to the semi-final. Earlier, the Hyderabad posted 281 with the help of Sandeep's 96-run knock along with the supporting knocks from Rayudu and Sumanth in the middle and brisk scoring from Milind at the end. The Hyderabad was eliminated in the semi-final where the Mumbai defeated them in a rain-hit match by 60 runs. The Hyderabad were troubled early in the match despite Sandeep's counter-attack and were reduced to 123/6 in 35 overs but an unbeaten ton from Rohit along with the support from Akash Bhandari and Mehdi helped the Hyderabad post 246 in 50 overs. Prithvi Shaw started aggressively for the Mumbai scoring his fifty in just 34 balls and helped the Mumbai post 155 in 25 overs along with the support of an unbeaten half-century from Shreyas Iyer before the rain stopped the play. The Mumbai were adjudged winners as they were ahead by 60 runs according to the VJD method.

Points table
Group B

Points system : W = 4, T/NR = 2, L = 0.

Knockout stage

Matches
Group Stage

Quarter-final

Semi-final

Statistics

Batting

Bowling

Ranji Trophy

Ranji Trophy, a first-class cricket tournament in India, fixtures were announced by the Board of Control for Cricket in India (BCCI) on 29 August 2018 and the Hyderabad was placed in Group B. The team was selected on 29 October with Akshath Reddy appointed as the captain to lead the team in their opening match against the Kerala on 1 November in the absence of their senior player, Ambati Rayudu, who was on the national duty. Rayudu later announced his retirement from the first-class cricket on 3 November to focus on the shorter version of the game.

The Hyderabad began their campaign with a draw against the Kerala. The centuries from Sachin Baby and VA Jagadeesh helped the Kerala declare their first innings at 495/6 after they lost the toss and were put to bat by the Hyderabad. The rain played the spoil-sport washing out the third day with the match heading towards the draw while Kolla Sumanth and Bavanaka Sandeep avoided the Kerala bowl out the Hyderabad for three points on the last day as both teams shared one point each in the end. The Hyderabad won the toss and elected to bat in the second match against the Tamil Nadu who were competing without their main players – Ravichandran Ashwin, Murali Vijay and Vijay Shankar. Akshath led their batting from the front scoring his maiden double century in the first-class cricket while Sandeep scored a century as the Hyderabad declared their innings at 565/8 inside first hour of the third day. The centuries from Abhinav Mukund and Narayan Jagadeesan helped the Tamil Nadu not lose the wickets as their first innings remained unfinished ending the match in a draw as both teams shared a point. The Hyderabad faced the Nitish Rana-led Delhi on 20 November as they won the toss and elected to bat in their first home match of the tournament while the Delhi missed the services of their senior players, Gautam Gambhir and Ishant Sharma, in this match. The century from Tanmay Agarwal provided the good start for the Hyderaabad while the maiden century from Ravi Teja and his 133-run stand with Chama Milind helped the Hyderabad post 460 in their first innings despite the middle-order collapse. The debutant, Tanay Thyagarajan, put the Hyderabad on the top as his five-wicket haul helped the Hyderabad secure the first innings lead on the last day of the match despite the half-centuries from Hiten Dalal, Lalit Yadav and Rana. Having already secured three points for the match and not much time to get the result for the match, the Hyderabad posted 156/1 in 43 overs with the help of the half-centuries from Tanmay and Akshath before the both sides agreed to call-off the match early. The Hyderabad lost the toss and were asked to field as they faced the Himachal Pradesh in their fourth match. The century from Prashant Chopra along with the half-centuries from Priyanshu Khanduri and Mayank Dagar helped the Himachal post 351. In reply, the collective batting effort from the Hyderabad batsmen including the half-centuries from Akshath, Sandeep and Ravi Teja helped them secure a slender first innings lead of one run. The Hyderabad bowlers led by Ravi Kiran bowled out the Himachal on the last day for 97 in 45.2 overs in the second innings with Ravi Kiran claiming four wickets while their openers completed the chase in 29 overs to secure a ten-wicket win and a bonus point.

The Hyderabad were bowled out for 124 in 35.3 overs after losing the toss and asked to bat against the Madhya Pradesh in their fifth match of the tournament. Himalay Agarwal resisted the initial collapse to help the Hyderabad recover from 29/5 and remained unbeaten at 69 as Avesh Khan finished the innings with his seven-wicket haul. The debutant, Ajay Rohera, posted an unbeaten world-record debut score of 267 as the Madhya Pradesh declared their first innings at 562. The Hyderabad could not avoid the collapse once again as they were bowled out for 185 despite the half-century from Rohit Rayudu as the first innings hero for the Madhya Pradesh, Khan, finished the match with another five-wicket haul in the second innings to help the Madhya Pradesh win by an innings and a bonus point. Mohammad Siraj and Karthikeya Kak were added to the squad with former returning from a successful tour with the India A and latter on his form while playing for U-23 while KSK Chaitanya replaced the out-of-form Sumanth as wicket-keeper in the playing XI ahead of the match against the Bengal. The Hyderabad won the toss and elected to field which was affected by the delayed start due to wet outfield as Abhimanyu Easwaran's knock of 186 helped the Bengal post 336 despite the four-wicket haul from Ravi Kiran. In reply, the half-centuries from Rohit and Himalay could not help the Hyderabad get three points as the four-wicket hauls from Ashoke Dinda and Mukesh Kumar helped the Bengal take the first-innings lead of 24 runs in a drawn match.

Points table
Group B

Points system : win by an innings or 10 wickets = 7, win = 6, draw with first innings lead = 3, draw with first innings deficit = 1, no result = 1, loss = 0.

Matches
Group Stage

Statistics

Batting

Bowling

Syed Mushtaq Ali Trophy

The Syed Mushtaq Ali Trophy, a Twenty20 tournament in India, fixtures were announced by the Board of Control for Cricket in India (BCCI) and the Hyderabad was placed in the Group E with all the group fixtures to be played at New Delhi. Ambati Rayudu announced his availability for the team ahead of the tournament. The Hyderabad selectors made the passing of Yo-Yo fitness endurance test, an endurance test used by the Indian cricket team and the other international teams, as mandatory for the selection process to ascertain the fitness level of the players. The 15-men squad led by Rayudu was announced on 15 February 2019.

Points table
Group E

Points system : W = 4, T/NR = 2, L = 0.

Matches
Group Stage

Statistics

Batting

Bowling

Senior women's team

Squads

Senior Women's Challenger Trophy
Trisha got selected to the India Blue squad for the 2018–19 Senior Women's Challenger Trophy, a women's List A cricket tournament in India.

One Day League

Senior Women's One Day League, a Women's List A cricket tournament in India, fixtures were announced by BCCI on 26 October 2018 and the Hyderabad was placed in Elite Group C. The squad was selected on 12 November with Sravanthi Naidu leading the team as they faced the Odisha in their first match of the One Day League at Cuttack on 1 December.

The Hyderabad started the tournament on the winning note as they defeated the Odisha by 28 runs. The Hyderabad posted the total of 183/7 in 50 overs after winning the toss and electing to bat. Skipper Sravanthi was the top-scorer for the Hyderabad with an unbeaten knock of 49 while their opener, Trisha chipped in with 76-ball 47. In reply, the Odisha were restricted to 155/8 with Trisha and Himani Yadav taking two wickets each. An all-round performance from Trisha helped the Hyderabad defeat the Rajasthan by 78 runs in their second match of the tournament. The 107-run second wicket partnership between Trisha and Mamata Kanojia helped the Hyderabad post 207/5 in 50 overs with both scoring the half-centuries before the five-wicket haul from Trisha helped the Hyderabad bowl out the Rajasthan for 129. The Hyderabad were bowled out for 148 by the Himachal Pradesh despite the useful contributions from their middle order, Kanojia and Vanka Pooja, after they lost the toss and were put to bat in their third match. Neena Chaudhary's unbeaten knock of 49 completed the chase for the Himachal Pradesh who won the match in 37.5 overs with four wickets to spare. The Hyderabad bounced back from the defeat to beat the Uttar Pradesh by 53 runs and record their third win of the tournament. The half-centuries from Trisha and Kanojia helped the Hyderabad post the target of 212 to the Uttar Pradesh before the latter were bowled out for 158 with Trisha and Yadav sharing seven wickets between them.

The second consecutive half-century from Kanojia and a collective bowling effort helped the Hyderabad win their fifth match against the Jharkhand by 24 runs. Despite an early setback with Trisha's dismissal, an unbeaten half-century from Kanojia helped the Hyderabad post 155/8 in 50 overs while quick wickets during the Jharkhand's innings troubled them as they were eventually bowled out for 131. The three-wicket haul from Varsha Choudhary and three run-outs helped the Madhya Pradesh restrict the Hyderabad to 148/9 in 50 overs while the half-century from Tamanna Nigam helped the Madhya Pradesh complete the chase with four wickets to spare as the Hyderabad were handed their second defeat of the tournament in six matches. The Hyderabad suffered the second consecutive defeat as they fell short of target by 15 runs against the Assam despite the useful knocks from Vanka and Sunitha Anand. Earlier, Bhogi Shravani and Yadav shared five wickets between them to restrict the Assam to 205. The final group match against the Jammu & Kashmir was washed out which resulted in finishing fifth in the group stage and failing to advance to the knockout stage for the Hyderabad.

Points table
Elite Group C

Points system : W = 4, D/A = 2, L = 0.

Matches
Group Stage

Statistics

Batting

Bowling

T20 League

Senior Women's T20 League, a Women's Twenty20 cricket tournament in India, fixtures were announced by BCCI on 26 October 2018 and the Hyderabad was placed in Group D.

Points table
Group D

Points system : W = 4, D/A = 2, L = 0.

Matches
Group Stage

Statistics

Batting

Bowling

See also
Hyderabad cricket team 
Hyderabad women's cricket team 
Hyderabad Cricket Association

References

External links
Hyderabad cricket team official site

Cricket in Hyderabad, India
Cricket in Telangana
Sport in Telangana